Xavian Virgo (born 25 October 1985) is a Jamaican footballer who plays as a defender for Mount Pleasant Football Academy.

Club career
Virgo was one of Boys' Town's most influential players when they clinched promotion to the Jamaica National Premier League in the 2004–05 season. He was only 19 years of age at that time. He was the backbone of the Boys' Town backline, Virgo has led the squad to a return to the Premier League followed by two successive Flow Jamaica Cup titles.

In 2013, Virgo moved to Harbour View F.C.

International career
Virgo made his debut for Jamaica in a September 2006 Gold Cup qualifying match against Saint Lucia. Xavian earned his ninth cap against South Africa after not been involved in the squad for over three years. Virgo also scored for Jamaica versus New Zealand on 29 February 2012.

Honours
KSAFA Super League: 1
 2004
JFF Champions Cup: 2
 2009, 2010
Premier league :1
 2013

References

External links

 Profile at Golocaljamaica

1985 births
Living people
Jamaican footballers
Jamaica international footballers
Boys' Town F.C. players
Sportspeople from Kingston, Jamaica
Harbour View F.C. players
Association football defenders
National Premier League players